Maqsudabad (also Romanized as Maqşūdābād) is a village in Kushk-e Hezar Rural District, Beyza District, Sepidan County, Fars Province, Iran. At the 2006 census, its population was 124, in 27 families.

References 

Populated places in Beyza County